Edna Township is a civil township in Barnes County in the U.S. state of North Dakota.  As of the 2000 Census, its population was 74. It is the 20th largest township in the county in terms of both total population and population density.

History
The township is named after Edna Booth, daughter of Albert Anson Booth (1850 – 1914), a pioneer who settled in Barnes County in 1879. Booth established a rural post office out of his home on July 25, 1882. He originally planned to name it after his daughter, who was the first white child born in the township, but instead named it Booth. Service was discontinued on November 14, 1884. However, the township retains the name.

The Booth post office was located approximately 1 mile from the present city of Rogers.

Geography
Edna Township is located in northwest Barnes County between the cities of Wimbledon and Rogers.

The township lies in survey township T142N R60W. North Dakota Highway 9 runs through the southern part of the township.

Natural Features
Orner Slough
Ray Holland Marsh Wildlife Management Area

Adjacent townships/areas
Lake Town Township (north)
Rogers Township (east)
Anderson Township (south)
Uxbridge Township (west)

Cities and populated places
Leal

References

External links
Map of Edna Township, U.S. Census Bureau

Townships in Barnes County, North Dakota
Populated places established in 1882
Townships in North Dakota